The Tarot of Marseilles is a standard pattern of Italian-suited tarot pack with 78 cards that was very popular in France in the 17th and 18th centuries for playing tarot card games and is still produced today. It was probably created in Milan before spreading to much of France, Switzerland and Northern Italy. The name is sometimes spelt Tarot of Marseille, but the name recommended by the International Playing-Card Society is Tarot de Marseille, although it accepts the two English names as alternatives. It was the pack which led to the occult use of tarot cards, although today bespoke cards are produced for this purpose.

Origins

Research by Michael Dummett and others demonstrates that the tarot pack was probably invented at or near Ferrara in northern Italy in the early 15th century and introduced into southern France when the French conquered Milan and the Piedmont in 1499. The antecedents of the Tarot de Marseille would then have been introduced into southern France at around that time. The 78-card version of the game of Tarot died out in Italy but survived in France and Switzerland. When the game was reintroduced into northern Italy, the Marseilles designs of the cards were reintroduced with it. All Italian-suited tarot decks outside of Italy are descended from the Milan–Marseilles type with the exception of some early French and Belgian packs which show mixed influence from Bolognese tarot (see below). The earliest surviving cards of the Marseilles pattern were produced by Philippe Vachier of Marseilles in 1639 and went up for sale in 2023, having recently been discovered by Thierry Depaulis.

The documentary Les mystères du Tarot de Marseille (Arte, 18 February 2015) claims that the work of Marsilio Ficino can be credited as having inspired imagery specific to the Marseilles.

Etymology and English translation
The name Tarot de Marseille is not of particularly ancient vintage; it was coined as late as 1856 by the French card historian Romain Merlin, and was popularized  by French cartomancers Eliphas Levi, Gérard Encausse, and Paul Marteau who used this collective name to refer to a variety of closely related designs that were being made in the city of Marseilles in the south of France, a city that was a centre of playing card manufacture, and were (in earlier, contemporaneous, and later times) also made in other cities in France. The Tarot de Marseille is one of the standards from which many tarot decks of the 19th century and later are derived.

Others have also tended to use the initials TdM, allowing for ambiguity as to whether the M stands for Marseille or Milan, a region claimed for the origins of the image design.

In deference to the common appellation Marseille for the style and in recognition that the deck appears in other places, the term "Marseille-style" is at times also used.

Structure

Like other tarot decks, the Tarot de Marseille contains fifty-six cards in the four standard suits and twenty-two tarot cards. In the French language, the four suits are identified by their French names of Bâtons (Batons), Épées (Swords), Coupes (Cups), and Deniers (Coins). These count from Ace to 10. There was also an archaic practice of ranking the cards 10 to Ace for the suit of cups and coins in line with all other tarot games outside of France and Sicily.

As well, there are four face cards in each suit: a Valet (Knave or Page), Chevalier or Cavalier (Horse-rider or Knight), Dame (Queen) and Roi (King). Occultists (and many tarot readers nowadays, whether English- or French-speaking) call this series the Minor Arcana (French: arcanes mineures). The court cards are sometimes called les honneurs (the honours) or les lames mineures de figures (the minor picture cards) in French, and the "Royal Arcana" in English. For the valet de bâtons (French > "Page of Batons"), the title of that card generally appears on the side of the card, while in some old versions of the Tarot de Marseille that card, along with either some or all others, is left unnamed.

In the Tarot de Marseille, as is standard among Italian suited playing cards, the pip cards in the suit of swords are drawn as abstract symbols in curved lines, forming a shape reminiscent of a mandorla. On the even numbered cards, the abstract curved lines are all that is present. On the odd numbered cards, a single fully rendered sword is rendered inside the abstract designs. The suit of batons is drawn as straight objects that cross to form a lattice in the higher numbers; on odd numbered baton cards, a single vertical baton runs through the middle of the lattice. On the tens of both swords and batons, two fully rendered objects appear imposed on the abstract designs. The straight lined batons and the curved swords continue the tradition of Mamluk playing cards, in which the swords represented scimitars and the batons polo mallets.

In this abstraction, the Tarot, and the Italian playing cards tradition, diverges from that of Spanish playing cards, in which swords and batons are drawn as distinct objects. Cups and coins are drawn as distinct objects. Most decks fill up blank areas of the cards with floral decorations. The two of cups typically contains a floral caduceus-like symbol terminating in two heraldic dolphin heads. The two of coins usually joins the two coins by a ribbon motif; the ribbon is a conventional place for the manufacturer to include his name and the date.

There is also a suit of twenty-two atouts (trump cards). The Fool, which is unnumbered in the Tarot de Marseille, is viewed as separate and additional to the other twenty-one numbered trumps because it usually cannot win a trick. Occultists and others using the cards for divination call these twenty-two cards les lames majeures de figures (the major figure cards) or arcanes majeures (Major Arcana) in French.

The labelling of cards is a practice of French origin, Italians remembered their names by heart. The XIII card is generally left unlabelled in the various old and modern versions of the tarot de Marseille, but it is worth noting that in Noblet's deck (circa 1650), the card was named LAMORT (Death). In at least some printings of the French/English bilingual version of Grimaud's pack, the XIII card is named "La Mort" in French and named "Death" in English. In many modern cartomantic tarot decks (e.g., Rider–Waite), the XIII card is named Death.

The names given to the Marseilles pattern trumps differ from those in early Italian sources. The French la Force (Strength) is in Italian la Fortezza (Fortitude) for the cardinal virtue of Courage. L'Amoureux (the Lover) is in Italy l'Amore (Love). Le Jugement (the Judgement) is l'Angelo (the Angel) or le Trombe (the Trumpets). L'Ermite (the Hermit) is given either as il Gobbo (the Hunchback), il Vecchio (the Old Man), or as il Tempo (Time). Le Pendu (the Hanged Man) is il Traditore (the Traitor). La Torre/la Maison Dieu (the Tower/the House of God) is given either as la Sagitta (the arrow), la Saetta (Lightning), la Casa del Diavolo (the House of the Devil), la Casa del Dannato (the House of the Damned), il Fouco (the Fire), or as l'inferno (Hell). The ranking of the trumps vary according to region or time period.

The following trump images are from Jean Dodal's deck printed in Lyon in the early 18th century. Like most other tarot decks, it uses additive Roman numerals, hence "IIII" instead of "IV". The English names are based on IPCS terminology. Dummett calls Tarot I "The Mountebank", a word which, like the name on the card, bataleur, means 'street entertainer'.

Variants

Besançon and Swiss patterns

The use of obviously Christian traditional images (such as the Pope, the Devil, the Grim Reaper and the Last Judgement) and indeed controversial images such as La Papesse have spawned controversies from the Renaissance to the present because of its portrayal of a female pope. There is no solid historical evidence of a female pope, but this card may be based around the mythical Pope Joan.

One variant of the Tarot de Marseille, now called the Tarot of Besançon, replaces the controversial Popess and Pope and, in their stead, puts Juno with her peacock, and Jupiter with his eagle. Developed in Alsace at the beginning of the 18th century, this deck was popular among Catholics living in regions that bordered Protestant communities. Protestants, and Catholics living outside contentious zones, preferred using the Marseilles pattern. During the French Revolution, the Emperor and Empress cards became the subject of similar controversies and were displaced by Grandfather and Grandmother. It arrived in Besançon only at the beginning of the 19th century where mass-production caused the current association of this deck to that city. An updated variant of the Besançon pattern is the Swiss 1JJ Tarot which is still in use by Troccas and Troggu players.

Piedmontese and Lombard patterns

In the early eighteenth century the Marseilles Tarot was introduced in Northern Italy starting from the Kingdom of Sardinia, which also included the Savoy (now in France) and Piedmont, where the card manufacturing industry collapsed following a severe economic depression. The Piedmontese players did not have difficulties to accept the Marseilles Tarot, because the images were similar and even the French language captioning was widespread in many areas of Piedmont.

Around 1820 some manufacturers active in Turin, capital of the Kingdom of Sardinia, began to produce tarot decks in Marseille's pattern, but after few years they introduced captions in Italian and small variations in certain figures. For example, the Fool was not chased by a wild animal but had a butterfly in front of him. In a few decades, variation after variation, was consolidated the iconography of the Piedmontese Tarot, which therefore must be considered as a derivation of the Tarot of Marseilles. It is currently the most widely used tarot deck in Italy.

In the Austrian-ruled Duchy of Milan (modern-day Lombardy), the Marseilles pattern also took root with Italian captioning starting around 1810. The "Death" card was given several names by different manufacturers such as il Tredici (Thirteen), lo Specchio (the Skeleton), and Uguaglianza (Equality). Production of this pattern stopped before the First World War.

Around 1835, Carlo Della Rocca of Milan engraved an elaborate interpretation of the Marseilles pattern. It became popular throughout Lombardy for the duration of the 19th century. It spread to Piedmont where a double-ended version was adapted to local tastes and was popular until the 1950s.

Early French decks and the Belgian pattern

A few early French decks exhibit certain curiosities. The 1557 luxury tarot deck by Catelin Geoffrey of Lyon, the early 17th century Tarot de Paris, and Jacques Viéville's Parisian deck (c.1650) share many things in common with each other and the Marseilles pattern but also have designs that seem to be derived from the Bologna-Florence tradition as seen in the Tarocco Bolognese and the Minchiate.

Adam de Hautot of Rouen produced a deck similar to Viéville's around the second quarter of the 18th century where la Papesse is replaced with Le 'Spagnol Capitano Eracasse (Italian > the 'Spanish Captain' Fracasso, a stock character from Commedia dell'arte). The Pope, often depicted holding an orb or a covered communion chalice, is replaced by Bacus (Bacchus, the Greek god of wine) holding a wine cup or bottle and a fruited vine cane or bunch of grapes while astride a beer barrel or wine cask; this was copied from the Deuce of Acorns found in some German-suited patterns. The Hanged Man is shown still pendant but right-side up. Temperance bears the motto FAMA SOL (Latin > "The Rumored or Omened Day") in a scroll, probably counseling patience until the day of their deliverance from Spain. The Tower is renamed La Foudre (French > "The Lightning"), and shows a man sitting beneath a tree being struck by lightning. The Star shows a man with compasses staring up at the sky next to a tower. The Moon shows a woman holding a distaff and The Sun shows a man on horseback bearing a banner. The World depicts a naked woman atop a globe parted into a moon in a starry sky and a sun in a blue sky over a tower on land. Unusually, the Fool is numbered as trump XXII likely showing that it functioned as the highest trump. Very similar decks were soon produced in the Austrian Netherlands (modern-day Belgium) until the beginning of the 19th century. Packaging indicates that they were locally called "Cartes de Suisse". This may suggest that Belgian players were being influenced by a new mode of play emanating from Switzerland in which the Fool is treated like the highest trump as in Troggu.

Dummett conjectures that this family of decks, especially those of Viéville's design, originate from the Savoy-Piedmont-Lombardy region and were used until the collapse of the local card manufacturing industry at the end of the 17th century (as described above). Viéville's ordering of the trumps is almost identical to 16th century orders in Pavia and Mondovì. However, no cards from this region before the 18th century are known to have survived to prove or disprove this theory.

Later history
All cards were originally printed from woodcuts; the cards were later coloured either by hand or by the use of stencils. Tarot was recorded as being very popular card game throughout France during the 16th and early 17th century but later fell into obscurity with the exception of eastern France and Switzerland. Very few Marseilles pattern cards from the 17th century have survived, chiefly among them are Noblet's. In contrast, dozens of decks from the 18th century have made it to the present. From eastern France and Switzerland, the game spread north to Sweden and east to Russia starting from the middle of the 18th century, making it one of the most popular card games of that era until being overtaken by Whist in the 19th century.

One well-known artisan producing tarot cards in the Marseilles pattern was Nicolas Conver (circa 1760). It was the Conver deck, or a deck very similar to it, that came to the attention of Antoine Court de Gébelin in the late 18th century. Court de Gébelin's writings, which contained much by way of speculation as to the supposed Egyptian origin of the cards and their symbols, called the attention of occultists to tarot decks. As such, Conver's deck became the model for most subsequent esoteric decks, starting with the deck designed by Etteilla forward. Cartomancy with the Tarot was definitely being practised throughout France by the end of the 18th century; Alexis-Vincent-Charles Berbiguier reported an encounter with two "sibyls" who divined with Tarot cards in the last decade of the century at Avignon.

From the mid-18th to early 19th centuries, Marseilles and Besançon tarots were replaced by the French-suited animal tarots throughout most of Europe. These were then superseded by genre art tarots like the Industrie und Glück. French players ignored animal tarots but during the 20th century, they switched over to the genre art Tarot Nouveau. French truck drivers were still using the Marseilles pattern for French tarot as late as the 1970s.

In 1997 Alejandro Jodorowsky and Phillipe Camoin completed their reconstructed version of the Tarot of Marseille. Since then Jodorowky, in collaboration with Marianne Costa, published a Tarot book based around this reconstructed version of the Marseille deck.

Influence on French and English tarot design and usage
In the English-speaking world, where there is little or no tradition of using tarots as playing cards, tarot decks only became known through the efforts of occultists influenced by French tarotists such as Etteilla, and later, Eliphas Lévi. These occultists later produced esoteric decks that reflected their own ideas, and these decks were widely circulated in the anglophone world. Various esoteric decks such as the Rider–Waite Tarot deck (conceived by A. E. Waite and rendered by Pamela Colman Smith), and the Thoth Tarot deck (conceived by Aleister Crowley and rendered by Lady Frieda Harris)—and tarot decks inspired by those two decks—are most typically used. Waite, Colman Smith, Crowley and Harris were all former members of the influential, Victorian-era Hermetic Order of the Golden Dawn at different respective points in time; and the Golden Dawn, in turn, was influenced by Lévi and other French occult revivalists. Although there were various other respective influences (e.g., Etteilla's pip card meanings in the case of Waite/Colman Smith), Waite/Colman Smith's and Crowley/Harris' decks were greatly inspired by the Golden Dawn's member-use tarot deck and the Golden Dawn's tarot curriculum.

The Hermetic Order of the Golden Dawn was essentially the first in the Anglophone world to venture into esoteric tarot. Francophone occultists such as Court de Gebelin, Etteilla, Eliphas Lévi, Oswald Wirth and Papus were influential in fashioning esoteric tarot in the French-speaking world; the influence of these Francophone occultists has come to bear even on interpretation of the Tarot de Marseille cards themselves. Even though the Tarot de Marseille decks are not "occult" per se, the imagery of the Tarot de Marseille decks is claimed by Levi to have Hermetic influences (e.g., alchemy, astronomy, etc.). Referring to the Tarot, Eliphas Levi declares: "This book, which may be older than that of Enoch, has never been translated, but is still preserved unmutilated in primeval characters, on detached leaves, like the tablets of the ancients... It is, in truth, a monumental and extraordinary work, strong and simple as the architecture of the pyramids, and consequently enduring like those - a book which is the summary of all sciences, which can resolve all problems by its infinite combinations, which speaks by evoking thought, is the inspirer and moderator of all possible conceptions, and the masterpiece perhaps of the human mind. It is to be counted unquestionably among the very gret gifts bequeathed to us by antiquity..."

In the French-speaking world, users of the tarot for divination and other esoteric purposes such as Alejandro Jodorowsky, Kris Hadar, and many others, continue to use the Tarot de Marseille, although Oswald Wirth's Atouts-only (Major Arcana) tarot deck has enjoyed such popularity in the 20th century (albeit less so than the Tarot de Marseille). In the mid-1990s Jodorowsky contacted a late descendant of the Camoin family, who has printed the Tarot of Marseilles since the 19th century. They worked together for almost a decade to put together a 78-card deck, including the original detail and 11 color printing. Tarot decks from the English-speaking tradition (such as Rider–Waite and decks based on it) are also gaining some popularity in French-speaking countries.

Paul Marteau pioneered the number-plus-suit-plus-design approach to interpreting the numbered Minor Arcana cards ['pip cards'] of the Tarot de Marseille. Before Marteau's book Le Tarot de Marseille (which was first published "circa" 1930s), cartomantic meanings (such as Etteilla's) were generally the only ones published for interpreting Marseille pip cards. Even nowadays, as evinced by tarot readings of members of French-language tarot lists and forums on the Internet, many French tarotists employ only the Major Arcana cards for divination. In fact, in recognition of this, many French-language Tarot de Marseille (even good ones, such as Picard's) discuss the symbolism and interpretation of only the Major Arcana. Many fortune-tellers in France who use the Tarot de Marseille for readings will use only the Major Arcana and will use an Etteilla deck if they are to use all 78 cards for the reading.

Many of the images of the Rider–Waite deck are derived from the Tarot de Marseille. However, the influence of other decks is also apparent, e.g., the 17th century Jacques Viéville deck for the Sun card and the 16th century Sola Busca tarot deck for certain pip cards, notably the 3 of Swords and 7 of Swords. The 19th century deck of Swiss-French occultist Oswald Wirth was also influential for certain of the iconographic features of the Atouts or Major Arcana cards of the RWCS deck.

Despite its name, very few people in present-day Marseille are familiar with the Tarot de Marseille, and tarot readers are rare to come by.

Reproductions
Due to its continuing popularity, there have been numerous facsimiles, restorations, and recreations of the Tarot of Marseilles:

 The French publisher Grimaud's Marseilles deck, published in 1970, was designed by Paul Marteau.
 The Italian firm Lo Scarabeo prints a reproduction of an 18th-century deck by Nicholas Conver, with a reconstructed card missing from their original.
 Lo Scarabeo also prints a version based on a 1751 Swiss deck by Claude Burdel, with an alteration that sees a 'zero' added upon the Fou. (But see Stuart Kaplan, Encyclopedia of Tarot Vol. II, page 327, which shows a 1750 Swiss deck by Rochus Schär, in which Le Mat card is numbered with a zero).
 The French firm Héron publishes a photo-reproduction of the complete Conver deck held in the Bibliothèque Nationale.
 The Spanish publisher Fournier prints an edition.
 U.S. Games Systems printed the CBD Marseilles Tarot by Yoav Ben-Dov, which was based on the Nicholas Conver deck.
 Cartamundi released a deck based on the 1701 Dodal Tarot de Marseille.
 The Dodal deck held in the Bibliothèque Nationale was photographically published by Dussere.
 Jean-Claude and Roxanne Flornoy have also published renditions of the Noblet and the Dodal decks.
 In 1998 Alejandro Jodorowsky and Philippe Camoin published a restored version of the Tarot of Marseilles based on a study of all the oldest existing decks and wooden moulds.
 in 2003, Daniel Rodes and Encarna Sanchez of Le Mat published  El Tarot de Marsella: Los antiguos iconos del Tarot reconstruidos, featuring a reconstructed Marseilles Tarot.
 Igor Barzilai published a restoration of the Nicolas Conver tarot, hand-painted, and using old paper techniques.
 In 2019, Krisztin Kondor and William Rader of Artisan Tarot of Denver, Colorado, published a restored and redrawn edition of the Nicolas Conver tarot. Artwork was added to bring the cards up to the popular tarot aspect ratio of 2.75″ x 4.75″. Two versions were published in French and English. Additionally, Kondor released a limited edition 11-3/4” x 16-1/2" linocut print of Le Bateluer, in eight colors of ink on archival quality paper.

References

Literature 
 Dummett, Michael (1980). The Game of Tarot  – a history of the Tarot, and a compilation of Tarot card games.
 Decker, Ronald, Thierry Depaulis and Michael Dummett (1996). A Wicked Pack of Cards: The Origins of the Occult Tarot by Ronald Decker, 
 Depaulis, Thierry. (2023). "Un Tarot de Marseille de 1639!" in Le Vieux Papier, fasc. 447, January 2023, pp. 194–200.
 Depaulis, Thierry. (2023). "The 'Tarot de Marseille' - Facts and Fallacies (I), The Playing-Card, Vol. 42, No. 1 (July–September 2013) and No. 2 (October–December 2013).

External links

 History of the Tarot de Marseille by Philip Camoin
 Tarot History by James W. Revak
 Vergnano Tarot 1830 by Giordano Berti

Tarot playing card decks
French tarot
Divination Tarot decks